Doug Karsch (born ) is an American talk radio show host and the Michigan Wolverines football radio play by play announcer (along side Jon Jansen), based in Detroit, Michigan.

Education and early career
Karsch was born in Champaign, Illinois and graduated from Michigan State University with a degree in communications. He got his start in broadcasting at TV station WEYI in Flint as a sports reporter. He made his radio debut in 1994 on WTKA in Ann Arbor. He has hosted pre-game/halftime/post-game coverage of Wolverine basketball. Nationally he has been heard on ESPN College Football Tailgate on ESPN Radio. He has also covered NASCAR and CART races.

Current roles

Radio
He is the co-host of Karsch & Anderson (formerly the Big Show), a radio talk show heard weekdays on WXYT-FM "97.1 The Ticket" in Detroit, Michigan. 
Doug also hosted The Brady Hoke Radio Show, a weekly syndicated Michigan Wolverines football discussion program, along with Jim Brandstatter, and varying assistant coaches and players which airs live on Thursdays during the college football season.

He is also the sideline reporter during Michigan football games.

In April 2014 Karsch was said to be among the finalists for the University of Michigan Football play by play radio position. The position was, in the end, awarded to Dan Dierdorf, who played football for Michigan and in the NFL, as well as having done color commentary for NFL games on ABC and CBS.

Starting in the fall of 2022 Karsch along with former Michigan football player Jon Jansen will be the new voices of Michigan Football.

Television
Karsch also hosts a weekly newsmagazine show for the Michigan Wolverines called Michigan Sports Weekly on the University's Michigan Channel, as well as Fox Sports Detroit and Big Ten Network

He also appears as a reporter on Inside Michigan Football, seen on the same channels.

Print
In addition to working at WXYT, Karsch has given interviews regarding his opinion of various news items about the Michigan Wolverines football team, that have later been published in The Detroit Free Press.
His radio interviews with other athletes, such as one given to him by Dontrelle Willis when he was signed to the Detroit Tigers, have been published in The Detroit Free Press.

References

American sports radio personalities
American talk radio hosts
American television personalities
Male television personalities
People from Champaign, Illinois
Michigan State University alumni
Living people
Michigan Wolverines football announcers
Motorsport announcers
College football announcers
College basketball announcers in the United States
Year of birth missing (living people)